Marchioro is an Italian surname. Notable people with the surname include:

 Alessandra Marchioro (born 1993), Brazilian swimmer
 Giuseppe Marchioro (born 1936), Italian footballer and manager

Italian-language surnames